Malka Halfon-Potashnik (born 1949) is an Israeli Paralympic champion. She won four gold, four silver, and one bronze medal.

Life 
Potashnik was born into the Halfon family and experiences paralysis in her right leg. She began training at a sports center for people with disabilities, and in 1967, she participated in the Stoke Mandeville Games where she won both gold and silver medals.

At the 1968 Summer Paralympics, in Tel Aviv, she won gold medals in Women's Shot Put 5, Wheelchair Basketball, Women's Club Throw Special class, and Women's Javelin Special class. She won silver medals in Women's Shot Put Special class, Women's 50 meters Breaststroke Special class, and Women's Discus Throw Special class.

At the 1972 Summer Paralympics, in Heidelberg, she won a gold medal in Women's Shot Put 5, silver medal in Women's Javelin 5, and bronze medal in Women's Discus Throw 5.
At the 1992 Summer Paralympics in Barcelona, she competed in Women's Discus Throw THS2, and  Women's Shot Put THS2.

Family 
In 1968, she married disabled athlete Zvi Potchnik. During the late 1960s, while at the height of her athletic career, she worked as a female operator at the Office Mechanization Center (MLA) of the Ministry of Finance.

References 

1949 births
Living people
Paralympic athletes of Israel
Paralympic wheelchair basketball players of Israel
Paralympic swimmers of Israel
Israeli women's wheelchair basketball players
Israeli female discus throwers
Israeli female shot putters
Israeli female javelin throwers
Athletes (track and field) at the 1968 Summer Paralympics
Athletes (track and field) at the 1972 Summer Paralympics
Athletes (track and field) at the 1992 Summer Paralympics
Swimmers at the 1968 Summer Paralympics
Wheelchair basketball players at the 1968 Summer Paralympics
Paralympic gold medalists for Israel
Paralympic silver medalists for Israel
Paralympic bronze medalists for Israel
Medalists at the 1968 Summer Paralympics
Medalists at the 1972 Summer Paralympics
Wheelchair discus throwers
Wheelchair javelin throwers
Wheelchair shot putters
Paralympic discus throwers
Paralympic javelin throwers
Paralympic club throwers
Paralympic shot putters